Machimia desertorum is a moth in the family Depressariidae. It is found in Patagonia.

The wingspan is about 17 mm for males and 19 mm for females. The forewings are yellowish-grey with a reddish tinge and dark scales. The hindwings are shining whitish.

References

Moths described in 1875
Machimia